This is a list of light gun games, video games that use a non-fixed gun controller, organized by the arcade, video game console or home computer system that they were made available for. Ports of light gun games which do not support a light gun (e.g. the Sega Saturn version of Corpse Killer) are not included in this list. Arcade games are organized alphabetically, while home video games are organized alphabetically by the system's company and then subdivided by the respective company's systems in a chronological fashion.

Arcade

2 SPICY (Sega, 2007)
Alien 3: The Gun (Sega, 1993)
Aliens: Armageddon (Raw Thrills, 2014)
Aliens: Extermination (Global VR, 2006)
Area 51 (Atari, 1995)
Area 51: Site 4 (Atari Games, 1998)
Area 51 / Maximum Force Duo (Atari Games, 1998)
Bang! (Gaelco, 1998)
Bazooka (Taito, 1995)
Balloon Gun (Sega, 1975)
Battle Shark (Nintendo, 1977)
Bullet Mark (Sega, 1975)
Beast Busters: Second Nightmare (SNK, 1999)
Beast Busters (SNK, 1989)
Behind... Enemy Lines (Sega, 1998)
Big Buck Hunter 2006 Call Of The Wild (Incredible Technologies, 2005)
Big Buck Hunter II Sportsman's Paradise (Incredible Technologies, 2003)
Big Buck Hunter Pro Open Season (Raw Thrills, Inc., 2009)
Big Buck Hunter Pro (Raw Thrills, Inc., 2006)
Big Buck Hunter Shooter's Challenge (Incredible Technologies, 2002)
Big Buck Hunter (Incredible Technologies, Inc., 2000)
Big Buck Safari (Raw Thrills, Inc., 2008)
Big Buck World (Raw Thrills, Inc., 2010)
Born To Fight (International Games, 1989)
Bronx (Bootleg, 1986)
Bubble Trouble: Golly! Ghost! 2 (Namco, 1994)
CarnEvil (Midway, 1998)
Carnival King (Incredible Technologies, 2002)
Cheyenne (Exidy, 1984)
Chiller (Exidy, 1986)
Clay Pigeon (Exidy, 1986)
Claybuster (Taito, 1978)
Combat / Catch-22 (Exidy, 1985)
Confidential Mission (Sega of America, Inc., 2000)
Cops (Atari, 1994)
Cosmoswat (Namco, 1984)
Crackshot (Exidy, 1985)
Crazy Fight (Seta, 1996)
Crime Patrol (American Laser Games, 1993)
Crime Patrol 2: Drug Wars (American Laser Games, 1993)
Crisis Zone (Namco, 1999)
Crossbow (Exidy, 1983)
Crypt Killer (Konami, 1995)
Cycle Shooting (Taito, 1986)
Dead Eye (Konami 1978/1996)
Death Crimson Ox (Sega, 2000)
Deer Hunting USA (Sammy USA, July 18, 2000)
Desert Gun (Midway, 1977)
Desert Patrol (Taito, 1977)
Dragon Gun (Data East, 1993)
Egg Venture (The Game Room and Innovative Concepts in Entertainment, 1997)
Evil Night / Hell Night (Konami, 1998)
Extreme Hunting 2 (Atomiswave, 2006)
Extreme Hunting (Atomiswave, 2005)
Friction (Friction Game Studios, 2011)
Gallagher's Gallery (American Laser Games, 1992)
Ghost Hunter (HanaHo Games, 1996)
Ghost Squad (Sega, 2004)
Ghost Squad Evolution (Sega, 2007)
Ghoul Panic (Eighting/Raizing, 1999)
Golden Gun (Sega Shanghai Software, 2010)
Golgo 13 Kiseki No Dandou (Eighting/Raizing,, 1999)
Golgo 13 (Eighting/Raizing, 1999)
Golly! Ghost! (Namco, 1990)
Great Guns (Stern Electronics, 1983)
Gun Champ (Taito, 1980)
Gun Survivor 2: Biohazard CODE:Veronica (Sega, 2001)
Gunblade NY (Sega, 1996)
Gunbuster (Taito, 1992)
Gunmania (Konami, 2000)
Gunslinger Stratos 2 (Square Enix, 2014)
Gunslinger Stratos (Square Enix, 2012)
Hammer (Andamiro, 2000)
Happy Hunter (Limenko, 2001)
Hit 'n Miss (Exidy, 1987)
Hogan's Alley (Nintendo, 1984)
Host Invaders (Innovative Concepts in Entertainment, 1998)
House of the Dead 4 Special (Sega, 2005)
House of the Dead 4 (Sega, 2005)
House of the Dead III (Sega, 2002)
House of the Dead: Scarlet Dawn (Sega, 2018)
Invasion: The Abductors (Midway, 1999)
Johnny Nero: Action Hero (Innovative Concepts in Entertainment, 2004)
Judge Dredd (Acclaim, 1997)
Jurassic Park Arcade (Raw Thrills, 2015)
Jurassic Park III (Konami, 2001)
Killer Shark (Sega, 1972)
L.A. Machineguns (Sega, 1998)
Laser Ghost (Sega, 1990)
Lethal Enforcers 3 (Konami, November 2004)
Lethal Enforcers II: Gunfighters (Konami, March 1994)
Lethal Enforcers (Konami, October 14, 1992)
Lethal Justice (The Game Room, 1996)
Let's Go Jungle!: Lost on the Island of Spice (Sega, June 27, 2006)
Line Of Fire / Bakudan Yarou (Sega, 1989)
Locked 'n Loaded (Data East, 1994)
Lord Of Gun (IGS, 1994)
Lucky & Wild (Namco, 1993)
Lupin the 3rd: The Shooting (Sega, 2001)
Mad Dog II: The Lost Gold (American Laser Games, 1992)
Mad Dog McCree (American Laser Games, December 1990)
Mallet Madness (HanaHo Games, 1999)
Manic Panic Ghosts (Sega, 2007)
Maximum Force (Atari Games, 1997)
Mechanized Attack (SNK, 1989)
Mobile Suit Gundam Final Shooting (Banpresto, 1995)
Monster Eye (IGS, 2014)
Monster Eye 2 (IGS, 2018)
N.Y. Captor (Taito, 1985)
Ninja Assault (Namco, November 18, 2000)
One Shot One Kill (Promat, 1996)
Operation G.H.O.S.T. (Sega, 18 April 2012)
Operation Thunder Hurricane (Konami, 1996)
Operation Thunderbolt (Taito, 1988)
Operation Tiger  (Taito, 1998)
Operation Wolf 3 (Taito, 1994)
Operation Wolf (Taito, 1987)
Panic Museum / Haunted Museum (Taito, 2010)
Panic Museum 2 / Shh...! Welcome to Frightfearland / Haunted Museum II: Youkoso Gen'ei Yuuenchi he (Taito, 2011)
Point Blank (arcade game) (Namco, 1994)
Point Blank 2 (arcade game) (Namco, 1999)
Point Blank 3 (arcade game) (Namco, 2000)
Point Blank X (arcade game) (Namco, 2016)
Police 24/7 (Konami, 2001)
Police 911 2 (Konami, 2001)
Police 911 (Konami, 2000)
Police Trainer 2 (Team Play Inc., 2003)
Police Trainer (P&P Marketing, 1996)
Pop Shot (Dynamo, 1991)
P's Attack (IGS, 2004)
Rail Chase 2 (Sega, 1991)
Rail Chase (Sega, 1995)
Rambo (Sega, 2008)
Ranger Mission (Sammy, 2004)
Rapid Fire (HanaHo Games, 1998)
Razing Storm (Namco, 2009)
Revolution X (Midway, 1994) 
Sea Devil (Sega, 1972)
Sega Clay Challenge (Sega, 2008)
Sharpshooter (P&P Marketing, 1998)
Shoot Away (Namco, 1977)
Shoot The Bear (Seeburg,  1949)
Shooting Gallery (Seatongrove Ltd (Zaccaria license), 1984)
Shooting Master (Sega, 1985)
Shootout at Old Tucson (American Laser Games, 1994)
Silent Hill: The Arcade (Konami, 2007)
Silent Scope 2 (Konami, 2000)
Silent Scope EX (Konami, 2001)
Silent Scope (Konami, 1999)
Skeet Shot (Dynamo, 1991)
Space Gun (Taito, 1990)
Space Pirates (American Laser Games, 1992)
Special Forces Elite Training (ICE/Play Mechanix, 2002)
Sports Shooting USA (Sammy, 2003)
Star Trek: Voyager The Arcade Game (Team Play, 2002)
Steel Gunner 2 (Namco, 1991)
Steel Gunner (Namco, 1990)
Target Hits (Gaelco, 1994)
Target: Terror (Raw Thrills, 2004)
Teraburst (Konami, 1999)
Terminator Salvation (Raw Thrills, 2010)
Terminator 2: Judgment Day (Midway, 1991)
The House of the Dead (Sega, 1996)
The House of the Dead 2 (Sega, 1998)
The Last Bounty Hunter (American Laser Games, 1994)
The Lost World: Jurassic Park (arcade game) (Sega, 1997)
The Maze of the Kings (Sega, 2002)
The Ocean Hunter (Sega, 1998)
Tickee Tickats (Raster Elite, 1994)
Time Crisis 3 (Namco, 2002)
Time Crisis 4 (Namco, 2006)
Time Crisis 5 (Namco, 2015)
Time Crisis II (Namco, 1997)
Time Crisis (Namco, 1995)
Total Vice (Konami, 1997)
Transformers: Human Alliance (Sega, 2013)
Triple Hunt (Atari, 1977)
Trophy Hunting: Bear & Moose (Sammy USA, June 30, 2003)
Turkey Hunting USA (American Sammy Corporation, July 20, 2001)
Turkey Shoot (Williams, 1984)
Tut's Tomb (Island Design, 1996)
Under Fire (Taito, 1993)
Vampire Night (Namco/Sega/Wow Entertainment, 2000)
Virtua Cop 2 (Sega, 1995)
Virtua Cop 3 (Sega, 2003)
Virtua Cop: Elite Edition (Sega, 2002)
Virtua Cop (Sega, 1994)
Virtual Combat (VR8 Inc., 1993)
Vs. Duck Hunt (Nintendo Vs. System, 1984)
Vs. Freedom Force (Ninttendo Vs. System, 1988)
Vs. Hogan's Alley (Nintendo Vs. System, 1984)
Who Dunit (Exidy, 1988)
Who Shot Johnny Rock? (American Laser Games, 1991)
Wild Gunman (Nintendo, 1974)
Wild Pilot (Jaleco, 1992)
Wing Shooting Championship (Sammy USA, December 31, 2002)
World Combat (Konami, 2003)
Zero Point (Unico, 1998)
Zero Point 2 (Unico, 1999)
Zombie Raid (American Sammy, 1995)
Zorton Brothers (Web Picmatic, 1993)

3DO Interactive Multiplayer

 Corpse Killer
 Crime Patrol 2: Drug Wars
 Crime Patrol
 Demolition Man
 The Last Bounty Hunter
 Mad Dog McCree
 Mad Dog II: The Lost Gold
 Space Pirates
 Who Shot Johnny Rock

Amstrad CPC

Gunstick CPC games:
 A-Team, The Gunstick 1988 Zafiro
 Bestial Warrior Gunstick 1989 Dinamic
 Guillermo Tell Gunstick 1989 Opera Soft
 Mike Gunner Gunstick 1988 Dinamic
 Solo Gunstick 1989 Opera Soft
 Space Smugglers Gunstick 1989 MHT Ingenieros
 Target Plus Gunstick 1988 Dinamic
 Trigger Gunstick 1989 Opera Soft

Magnum CPC games:
 Bullseye Magnum 19?? Macsen
 Missile Ground Zero Magnum 1989 Mastertronic
 Operation Wolf Magnum 1989 Ocean
 Robot Attack Magnum 1990 Mastertronic
 Rookie Magnum 1989 Mastertronic
 Solar Invasion Magnum 1990 Mastertronic

Trojan (CPC Plus) games:
 Skeet Shoot Trojan 199? Trojan
 Enforcer, The Trojan 199? Trojan

Westphaser (CPC) games:
 Crazy Shot Westphaser
 Steve McQueen Westphaser 1992 Loriciel
 West Phaser Westphaser 1989 Loriciel

Unconfirmed CPC games:
 American Turbo King Magnum? 1989 Mastertronic
 Billy The Kid Magnum? 1990 Mastertronic
 Bronx Street Cop Magnum? 1989 Mastertronic
 F-16 Fighting Falcon Magnum? 1989 Mastertronic
 Jungle Warfare Magnum? 1989 Mastertronic
 Space Harrier II

APF TV FUN
 Pistol

Atari

Atari 2600

Sentinel
Shooting Arcade (unreleased)
Bobby needs Food (homebrew)

Atari 7800

Alien Brigade
Barnyard Blaster
Crossbow
Meltdown
Sentinel

Atari 8-bit family

Barnyard Blaster
Bug Hunt
Crossbow
Cementerio
Crime buster
GangstersVille
Operation Blood

Atari ST
Trojan Light Phazer
Cyber Assault (Trojan, 1991)
Die Hard II: Die Harder (Grandslam, 1992)
Firestar (Trojan, 1991)
Orbital Destroyer (Trojan, 1991)
Skeet Shoot (Trojan, 1991)
Space Gun (Ocean, 1992)
The Enforcer (Trojan, 1991)
Loriciel Phaser (West Phaser) light gun
West Phaser (Loriciel, 1989)
Crazy Shot (Loriciel, 1989)

Binatone TV MASTER
Shooting

Commodore

Commodore 64
Army Days
Baby Blues
Blaze-Out (compilation of: RoboCop, Combat School, Hyper Sports, Platoon, Rambo III for use with a light gun)
Cosmic Storm
Gangster
Ghost Town
GooseBusters
Grouse Shoot
Gunslinger
High Noon Shootout
Mike Gunner
Operation Thunderbolt
Operation Wolf
Shooting Gallery
Shootin' Putin
Target Plus
Time Traveller
Star Wars: The Empire Strikes Back
Space Harrier
Space Harrier 2
Prohibition
Space Gun
The Exterminator

Amiga
Actionware Phazer
Capone (Actionware, 1988)
Creature (Actionware, 1989)
Operation Thunderbolt (Ocean, 1989) *
Operation Wolf (Ocean, 1988) *
P.O.W. (Actionware, 1988)
Sideshow (Actionware, 1988)
Golem light gun
Worldwide hunting (Golem, 1992)
Gateway Ypsilon (Golem, 1991)
Championship Shooting (Golem, 1992)
Master Of The Town (Golem, 1990)
Loriciel (West Phaser) light gun
Crazy Shot (Loriciel, 1989)
West Phaser (Loriciel, 1989)
Trojan Light Phazer
Aliex (Trojan, 1990)
Cyber Assault (Trojan, 1991)
Die Hard 2 (Grandslam, 1992)
Enforcer, The (Trojan, 1991)
Firestar (Trojan, 1991)
Operation Thunderbolt (Ocean, 1989) *
Operation Wolf (Ocean, 1988) *
Orbital Destroyer (Trojan, 1990)
Skeet Shoot (Trojan, 1991)
Space Gun (Ocean, 1992)

* Amiga game, which doesn't originally support lightgun, but later modified version for WHDLoad exists

Magnavox Odyssey
Shootout (game card #9)
Dogfight (game card #9)
Prehistoric Safari (game card #9)
Shooting Gallery (game card #10)

Microsoft

Windows

Area 51
Art is Dead (2001, Small Rockets)
Big Buck Hunter
Blue Estate
Crime Patrol
Crime Patrol 2: Drug Wars
Die Hard 2: Die Harder
Die Hard Trilogy 2: Viva Las Vegas (some of the levels are in the rail shooter format)
Ed Hunter
Fast Draw Showdown
Gunslinger Stratos: Reloaded
The House of the Dead

The House of the Dead 2
The House of the Dead III
The Typing of the Dead: Overkill (includes The House of the Dead: Overkill)

The Last Bounty Hunter
Mad Bullets
Mad Dog McCree
Mad Dog II: The Lost Gold
Nerf Jr. Foam Blaster: Attack of the Kleptons!
Remington Super Slam Hunting Africa
Space Pirates
Virtua Cop
Virtua Cop 2
Who Shot Johnny Rock?

Xbox

The House of the Dead III (also contains an unlockable port of The House of the Dead II)
Silent Scope Complete (contains three games)
Starsky & Hutch (video game)

Xbox 360
Cabela's African Adventures
Cabela's Big Game Hunter 2012
Cabela's Big Game Hunter: Hunting Party
Cabela's Dangerous Hunts 2011
Cabela's Dangerous Hunts 2013
Cabela's Hunting Expeditions
Cabela's North American Adventures
Cabela's Survival: Shadows of Katmai
MIB: Alien Crisis (Top Shot Elite)

Nintendo

Nintendo Entertainment System

Baby Boomer
Barker Bill's Trick Shooting
Chiller
Crime Busters
Duck Hunt
Freedom Force
Gotcha! The Sport!
Gumshoe
Hogan's Alley
Laser Invasion (contains light-gun segment)
Mechanized Attack
Mission Cobra
Operation Wolf
Shooting Range
Space Shadow (uses its own light gun; the Hyper Shot Light Gun)
Supergun 3-in-1
The Adventures of Bayou Billy (contains light-gun sequences)
The Lone Ranger (contains light-gun sequences)
To The Earth
Wild Gunman
Track & Field II (Bonus Game: Gun Firing)
Hit Marmot
Magnum Kikiippatsu: Empire City, 1931
Strike Wolf

Super Nintendo Entertainment System

 Battle Clash
 Bazooka Blitzkrieg
 The Hunt for Red October (gun is used for bonus games)
 Lamborghini American Challenge (it accesses a different game mode from the normal one)
 Lethal Enforcers (used its own gun: Konami Justifier)
 Metal Combat: Falcon's Revenge - aka Battle Clash 2
 Operation Thunderbolt
 Shien's Revenge
 Super Scope 6 cart (bundled with the gun and features six games, under Lazer Blazer and Blastris categories)
 Terminator 2: The Arcade Game
 Tin Star
 X-Zone
 Yoshi's Safari

Wii

The Wii is unique in that its standard controller can be used as a gun controller. Though a number of Wii games do not support these capabilities, those which do form an exhaustively long list of games, many of which have no resemblance to traditional light gun games. Thus, this section will only include games that either explicitly support the Wii Zapper or are rail shooters in nature. Virtual Console ports, such as Operation Wolf, did not include any amount of light gun support.

Wii Zapper Games

 Attack of the Movies 3D (light gun game)
 Big Buck Hunter
 Brothers in Arms: Double Time
 Cabela's Adventure Camp
 Cabela's African Adventures
 Cabela's Big Game Hunter 2010
 Cabela's Big Game Hunter (2007 video game)
 Cabela's Dangerous Hunts 2009
 Cabela's Dangerous Hunts 2011
 Cabela's Monster Buck Hunter
 Cabela's Outdoor Adventures (2005 video game)
 Cabela's Outdoor Adventures (2009 video game)
 Cabela's Survival: Shadows of Katmai
 Cabela's Trophy Bucks
 Call of Duty 3
 Call of Duty 4: Modern Warfare
 Call of Duty: World at War
 Call of Duty: Modern Warfare 3
 Call of Duty: Black Ops
 Chicken Blaster (light gun game)
 Chicken Riot (light gun game)
 Chicken Shoot (light gun game)
 Cocoto Magic Circus (light gun game)
 The Conduit
 Conduit 2
 Counter Force
 Dead Rising: Chop Till You Drop
 Dead Space: Extraction (light gun game)
 Deer Drive
 Dino Strike (light gun game)
 Fast Draw Showdown (light gun game)
 Ghost Squad (2007) (light gun game)
 GoldenEye 007 (2010 video game)
 The Grinder
 Gunblade NY and LA Machineguns Arcade Hits Pack (2 light gun games)
 Gunslingers (aka Western Heroes) (light gun game)
 Heavy Fire: Special Operations (WiiWare) (2010)
 Heavy Fire: Afghanistan (2011)
 Heavy Fire: Black Arms (WiiWare) (2012)
 The House of the Dead 2 & 3 Return(2 light gun games)
 The House of the Dead: Overkill (light gun game)
 Hunting Challenge
Jurassic: The Hunted
 Link's Crossbow Training (bundled with Wii Zapper) 
 Mad Dog McCree: Gunslinger Pack (3 light gun games)
 Martian Panic (light gun game)
 Medal of Honor: Heroes 2
 Medal of Honor: Vanguard
 Metroid Prime: Trilogy (requires the Cobalt Flux Dark Ops Wii gun shell peripheral for easy access of buttons and movement on the Wii's motion controls. Incompatible with the Wii Zapper due to required buttons and movement being inaccessible to the player's hands.)
 MIB: Alien Crisis
 Nerf N-Strike (light gun game)
 North American Hunting Extravaganza
 Pirate Blast (light gun game)
 Quantum of Solace
 Reload
 Remington Great American Bird Hunt
 Remington Super Slam Hunting: Africa
 Remington Super Slam Hunting: Alaska
 Remington Super Slam Hunting: North America
 Resident Evil 4 (Wii Edition)
 Resident Evil: The Darkside Chronicles (light gun game)
 Resident Evil: The Umbrella Chronicles (light gun game)
 Robin Hood: The Return of Richard
 Sin & Punishment: Star Successor
 Sniper Elite
 Target: Terror (April 22, 2008) (light gun game)
 Tom Clancy's Ghost Recon
 Tom Clancy's Splinter Cell: Double Agent
 Top Shot Arcade
 Transformers: Cybertron Adventures
 Wicked Monsters Blast!
 Wild West Guns (August 4, 2008) (light gun game)
 Wild West Shootout (light gun game)
 Zombie Panic in Wonderland (WiiWare)
 Solvalou
 Horizon Riders
 Incoming!
 Big Town Shoot Out
 Racers' Islands: Crazy Racers
 Rolling Thunder 2
 Starblade
 Blood Beach
 Twin Strike: Operation Thunder
 Bass Pro Shops: The Hunt
 Pheasants Forever: Wingshooter
 Pop
 Star Soldier R
 Deer Drive Legends
 Battle Rage: The Robot Wars
 Rebel Raiders: Operation Nighthawk
 Wild Guns (WiiWare)
 Eco-Shooter: Plant 530
 Cocoto Festival
 Cocoto Funfair
 All Round Hunter
 Ultimate Duck Hunting
 Disney's Chicken Little: Ace in Action
 Samurai Warriors: Katana

Party Games with rail shooter/shooting gallery sections
 Boom Blox
 Boom Blox Bash Party
 Carnival Games
 Rayman Raving Rabbids
 Rayman Raving Rabbids 2
 Rayman Raving Rabbids TV Party
 Wii Play

Nintendo Switch 
 House of the Dead (Remake)

Philips

CD-i

Atlantis the last resort
Chaos Control
Creature Shock
Crime Patrol
 Drug Wars
Mad Dog McCree
Mad Dog II: The Lost Gold
Mystic Midway: Phantom Express
Mystic Midway: Rest in Pieces
The Last Bounty Hunter
Thunder in Paradise
Who Shot Johnny Rock

Sega

Sega Master System

Assault City
Gangster Town
Laser Ghost
Marksman Shooting & Trap Shooting
Missile Defense 3-D
Operation Wolf
Rescue Mission
Rambo III
Safari Hunt
Shooting Gallery
Space Gun
Marksman Shooting / Trap Shooting / Safari Hunt
Wanted

Sega Genesis, Sega CD and Sega CD 32X

Menacer 6-game cartridge
Body Count
Corpse Killer (CD)
Crime Patrol (CD)
Lethal Enforcers
Lethal Enforcers (CD)
Lethal Enforcers 2
Lethal Enforcers 2 (CD)
Mad Dog McCree (CD)
Mad Dog II: The Lost Gold (CD)
Snatcher (CD) (contains light-gun sequences)
Terminator 2: The Arcade Game
Who Shot Johnny Rock (CD)

Unreleased Sega Genesis, Sega CD and Sega CD 32X light-gun games:
Battle Mission
 Crime Patrol 2: Drug Wars (CD)
Die Hard Trilogy (Genesis and 32X)
Monster Hunter 
 Revolution X (32X)
Space Pirates (CD)

Sega Saturn
Area 51
Chaos Control Remix (released in PAL regions under the title Chaos Control, causing it to be sometimes confused with the original)
Crypt Killer
Death Crimson
Die Hard Trilogy
The House of the Dead
Mighty Hits (PAL/JPN Only)
Maximum Force
Mechanical Violator Hakaider (Japan Only) 
Policenauts (contains light-gun sequences)
Scud the Disposable Assassin
Virtua Cop
Virtua Cop 2

Dreamcast

Confidential Mission
Death Crimson 2
Death Crimson OX
Demolition Racer: No Exit (Unlockable in the mini game 'Big Car Hunter', one of the only 2 American released games which worked with the official Sega light gun, released only in Asia and Europe)
The House of the Dead 2
Sega Smash Pack (contains Virtua Cop 2)
Silent Scope (game has no native light gun support, Bio Gun light gun has "Silent Scope" mode that allows use of d-pad on the gun as well as the trigger for firing, although the gun itself could not be used to move the crosshairs)
Virtua Cop 2 (Japan only)

List of cancelled Dreamcast gun games:

The House of the Dead 3
The Lost World: Jurassic Park (arcade game)
Time Crisis 2

Sinclair

ZX Spectrum
Magnum Light Phaser games came with the gun:
 Bullseye - Magnum 1987 Macsen Software
 Missile Ground Zero - Magnum 1989 Mastertronic
 Operation Wolf - Magnum 1989 Ocean
 Robot Attack - Magnum 1990 Mastertronic
 Rookie - Magnum 1989 Mastertronic
 Solar Invasion - Magnum 1990 Mastertronic
 Target Plus

The following games worked with the Magnum Light Phaser, but were brought out by third parties. Some were remakes of the Cheetah Defender Light gun games by Code Masters Ltd.

 Billy the Kid - (remake) - Virgin Mastertronic Ltd (UK)
 Bronx Street Cop - (remake) - Virgin Mastertronic Ltd (UK)
 F-16 Fighting Falcon - (remake) - Virgin Mastertronic Ltd (UK)
 Industria 14 - Mastertronic Ltd
 Jungle Warfare - (remake) - Virgin Mastertronic Ltd (UK)
 Living Daylights - The Computer Game, The - Domark Ltd
 Lord Bromley's Estate - Amstrad
 Make My Day - Mastertronic Ltd
 Q's Armoury - Amstrad
 American Turbo King - (A remake of Super Car Trans Am) - Virgin Mastertronic Ltd (UK)

Cheetah Defender Light gun games all by Code Masters Ltd:

 Advanced Pinball Simulator
 Billy The Kid
 Bronx Street Cop
 F-16 Fighting Falcon
 Jungle Warfare
 Supercar Trans-am (Super Car Trans Am)

It should also be noted that both versions of the light guns that were meant for the 128K+ or up, worked with almost all the games available.

Sony

Sony PlayStation 

The PlayStation has two major light guns: the GunCon/G-Con by Namco and the Konami Justifier (known as the Hyperblaster in Japan and Europe). Other licensed and non-licensed light guns are compatible with either Justifier games, GunCon games, or both.
Area 51 (Justifier/Hyperblaster)
Crypt Killer (Justifier/Hyperblaster)
Die Hard Trilogy (Justifier/Hyperblaster)
Die Hard Trilogy 2: Viva Las Vegas (JPN/PAL versions) (Justifier/Hyperblaster or Guncon)
Elemental Gearbolt (Justifier/Hyperblaster or GunCon)
Extreme Ghostbusters: Ultimate Invasion (GunCon)
Ghoul Panic (Released as "Oh! Bakyuuun" in Japan, uses GunCon)
GunBare! Game Tengoku 2 (JPN only)
Gunfighter: The Legend of Jesse James (GunCon)
Guntu Western Front June, 1944 (JPN only, GunCon)
Judge Dredd (Justifier/Hyperblaster or GunCon)
Lethal Enforcers 1&2 (Justifier/Hyperblaster)
Maximum Force (Justifier/Hyperblaster or GunCon)
Mighty Hits Special (EU/JPN only, Justifier/Hyperblaster)
Moorhuhn 2 - Die Jagd Geht Weiter'''Moorhuhn XPoint Blank (GunCon)Point Blank 2 (GunCon)Point Blank 3 (GunCon)Project Horned Owl (Justifier/Hyperblaster)Puffy P.S. I Love You (JPN only, GunCon)Rescue Shot (GunCon)Resident Evil Survivor (JPN/PAL versions) (GunCon)Silent Hill (Justifier/Hyperblaster, used for an easter egg)Star Wars: Rebel Assault II (Justifier/Hyperblaster, used for certain shooting sequences)The Gun Shooting (Simple 1500 Series) (JPN only, GunCon)The Gun Shooting 2 (Simple 1500 Series) (JPN only, GunCon)Time Crisis (GunCon)Time Crisis: Project Titan (GunCon)

 Sony PlayStation 2 Cocoto Funfair (EU only, GunCon 1 only)Death Crimson OX+ (JP) aka Guncom 2 (EU)Dino Stalker (EU/NA) aka Gun Survivor 3: Dino Crisis (JP) (differs from conventional light-gun games in that the player has freedom of movement)EndgameGunfighter II: Revenge of Jesse James (EU only)Gunvari Collection + Time Crisis (JP only)Ninja AssaultPolice 24/7 (Norgun) * Also can use a USB Camera (EU/JP Only)Resident Evil: Dead Aim (EU/NA) aka Gun Survivor 4 Biohazard Heroes Never Die (JP) (contains light-gun sequences)Resident Evil Survivor 2 Code: Veronica (EU) aka Gun Survivor 2 Biohazard Code: Veronica (JP) Starsky & HutchTime Crisis: Crisis ZoneTime Crisis IITime Crisis 3Vampire NightVirtua Cop: Elite Edition (EU/AUS) aka Virtua Cop Re-Birth (JP)

Sony PlayStation 3
The PlayStation 3 has two dedicated gun peripherals: the GunCon 3 by Namco and the Top Shot Elite by RedOctane. The PlayStation Move can also function as a gun controller. To qualify, games using the Move have to either support the "Move Sharp Shooter" peripheral or be rail shooter in nature.BioShock Infinite (PSMove)Cabela's African Adventures (Top Shot Elite)Cabela's Big Game Hunter 2012 (Top Shot Elite)Cabela's Dangerous Hunts 2011 (Top Shot Elite)Cabela's Dangerous Hunts 2013 (Top Shot Elite)Cabela's Hunting Expeditions (Top Shot Elite)Cabela's North American Adventures (Top Shot Elite)Cabela's Survival: Shadows of Katmai (Top Shot Elite)Child of Eden (PSMove)Counter-Strike: Global Offensive (PSMove)Dead Space Extraction HD (PSMove, light gun game)Deadstorm Pirates (GunCon 3 or PSMove, light gun game)Dust 514 (PSMove)Fast Draw Showdown (PSMove, light gun game)Gal*Gun (PSMove)GoldenEye 007: Reloaded (PSMove)Heavy Fire: Afghanistan (PSMove, light gun game)The House of the Dead 3 (PSMove, light gun game)The House of the Dead 4 (PSMove, light gun game)The House of the Dead: Overkill - Extended Cut (PSMove, light gun game)Killzone 3 (PSMove)Mad Dog McCree (PSMove, light gun game)Mad Dog II: The Lost Gold (PSMove, light gun game)MAG (PSMove)MIB: Alien Crisis (Top Shot Elite)Modern Combat: Domination (PSMove)PlayStation Move Ape Escape (PSMove)Resident Evil: Chronicles HD Collection (PSMove, 2 light gun games)Resistance 3 (PSMove)The Shoot (PSMove, light gun game)SOCOM 4 (PSMove)
 The Last Bounty Hunter(PSMove, light gun game)Time Crisis 4 (GunCon 3, light gun game)Time Crisis: Razing Storm (GunCon 3 or PSMove, light gun game)Wicked Monsters Blast! (PSMove)

Tiger Laser GamesArea 51Independence DayMars Attacks!Virtua CopStar Wars Rebel Forces''

References

External links
List of Gun Games
List of all Guncon45 compatible games (in German)
List of light gun games (Screenscraper)

 
Gun